Janet Paschal (born October 18, 1956) is an inspirational gospel vocalist. She has released numerous albums in that genre and has received multiple fan awards and Grammy and Dove Award nominations. She is also a songwriter and published author. In May 2019, she was inducted into the Gospel Music Association Hall of Fame in Nashville, Tennessee. Paschal was inducted into the North Carolina Music Hall of Fame in October, 2022.

Personal life 

Paschal was born in Reidsville, North Carolina. Paschal grew up in a Christian, musically inclined family with her father and his brothers playing bluegrass instruments and singing in area churches as the Paschal Brothers. Paschal's grandfather was a minister who served as an inspiration in her life as she attended his church growing up. As a teenager she, her sister, Kay, and a cousin formed their own gospel singing group called The Gospel Classics. Paschal started her professional career as a vocalist after graduating high school.

In 1998, Paschal met John Lanier, a commercial airline pilot. They married in 1999 in Reidsville, North Carolina.

Paschal was diagnosed with breast cancer in 2005 and took a year hiatus from touring, while undergoing chemotherapy and radiation treatments at Duke University Medical Center in Durham, North Carolina.

In 2017, Paschal earned a master's degree with honors in Accounting from the University of North Carolina, Greensboro, as well as induction into the Beta Gamma Sigma international honor society for collegiate schools of business.

Career 

At eighteen years old, Paschal was hired for her first professional singing job as the featured soprano with The LeFevres, an Atlanta-based family singing group. After two years, the group changed its name to The Rex Nelon Singers. She sang with the group from 1974 to 1981.

In 1982, she was invited to perform as a soloist for televangelist Jimmy Swaggart's international crusades. During her five and a half years with Swaggart, Paschal appeared weekly before 100 million viewers and traveled the world singing at crusades. During this time, she performed for more people worldwide than any other female vocalist in any genre. Paschal also began her solo career, releasing her first album titled "I Give You Jesus" on Swaggart's ministry label, Shiloh Records, in 1984.

In 1987, Paschal began touring full-time as a soloist. She signed with Word Records and began composing songs such as Another Soldier's Coming Home, God Will Make A Way, The Body and Blood, and If I'd Had My Way. Shortly afterwards she was invited to tour with Bill and Gloria Gaither and she became a featured artist on the Gaither Homecoming Tour.

Paschal's self-titled debut album with Word was nominated for a Dove Award for "Inspirational Album of the Year" in 1990. Her Simple Trust album featured her No. 1 inspirational radio hit, Take These Burdens. Her single, Hide Me Sweet Rock of Ages, was No. 1 on The Singing News Top 80 Chart in August 2009. Paschal's passion and vulnerability are evident in her inspiring music, including her latest release, Beginnings. She has earned multiple Diamond Awards and numerous Grammy nominations, and she is consistently named among Gospel Music's favorite soloists by the genre's top trade magazines.

In 1998, Paschal performed her song, Another Soldier's Coming Home, written as a tribute to her grandfather, upon invitation for the National Memorial Service of First Lieutenant Michael Blassie, the first unknown soldier from the Vietnam War to be exhumed and positively identified.

In 2009, Paschal started a radio program focused on cancer awareness, Walking The Good Road, that aired on more than 30 stations in the U.S. and Canada. She also began the Annual Cancer Walk at Gospel Music's premier weeklong festival, NQC.

In May 2019, Paschal was inducted into the Gospel Music Association Hall of Fame in Nashville, Tennessee. It is the association's highest award that recognizes trailblazers that have made a profound impact on Christian & gospel music.

In October 2022, Paschal was inducted into the North Carolina Music Hall of Fame in Kannapolis, North Carolina. The event recognizes the musical legacy of the state’s greatest music makers.

Other work 

Paschal served as the spokeswoman for an international Christian relief organization, "Mission of Mercy," founded by missionaries Mark and Huldah Buntain.

Paschal has authored two books:

 1997: The Good Road (Multnomah), a collection of her own writings and reflections on life, based on the book of Jeremiah
 2008: Treasures of the Snow (Maplesong), chronicles her triumphant battle with cancer and stories from three decades in gospel music. The title of the book is from a passage in the book of Job in which God asks Job if he has seen "the treasures of the snow.”

Paschal was a contributing writer to Homecoming Magazine with a monthly article called "The Good Road."

Discography

Solo

 2015: Beginnings (Word)
 2008: Treasure (Vine)
 2007: Sounds Like Sunday (Vine)
 2007: The Best Of Janet Paschal (Gaither Music Group)
 2007: Greatest Hits of Janet Paschal (Spring Hill)
 2004: Home Again (Maplesong Music)
 2002: This is Janet (Spring Hill)
 2000: Songs for a Lifetime (Spring Hill)
 1999: Christmas (Spring Hill)
 1998: Sweet Life (Spring Hill)
 1997: The Good Road (Spring Hill)
 1994: Journey of Grace (Word)
 1991: Simple Trust (Word)
 1990: Language of the Heart (Word)
 1988: Janet Paschal (Word)
 1986: An Evening With Janet Paschal (Shiloh)
 1986: Janet Paschal Live! (Shiloh)
 1984: I Give You Jesus (Shiloh)

With The Rex Nelon Singers

 1994: Promised Reunion (The Nelons)
 1981: One Step Closer
 1980: Sing the Gospel
 1980: One More Song
 1980: Expressions Of Love
 1979: Feelings
 1978: Live
 1977: The Sun's Coming Up
 1977: I've Never Been This Homesick Before

With The LeFevres

 1977: Singing 'Till He Comes
 1977: Sing Your Request
 1976: Gospel Music U.S.A.
 1975: Experience The LeFevres

Guest appearances on other albums

 2009: Homecoming Tributes & Classics; "Daystar"
 2005: A Tribute To George Younce
 2003: Masterpiece; Anthony Burger "Over the Rainbow"
 2003: It's My Life; Mike Bowling (background vocals)
 2002: Homecoming Lullabies; "Between Here And Heaven"
 2000: Hands of Time; Anthony Burger "What a Savior Medley: What a Savior/He Came To Me/Oh, What a Savior"
 2000: Fields Of Grace duet with Kirk Talley on title song
 1999: Vestal & Friends duet with Vestal Goodman on "Friends"
 1998: Because He Lives; "It's Beginning To Rain", "Get All Excited"
 1998: Grateful Hearts; "We Say Thank You"
 1998: Make Us One; "God Will Make a Way" with Vestal Goodman
 1997: Lovin' God & Lovin' Each Other; "Tell Me" with Gaither Vocal Band
 1997: Big Band Hymns; Chris McDonald "Let Us Break Bread Together"
 1996: Tribute: The Songs of Andrae Crouch; (various artists) "My Tribute (To God Be the Glory)"
 1995: Sisters: The Story Goes On; "Godspeed" with Babbie Mason and Tanya Goodman-Sykes
 1993: One Special Christmas; David T. Clydesdale "Home for Christmas Medley: I'll Be Home for Christmas/White Christmas"
 1988: Called By Love; "I Will Forever Praise Your Name" with Kelly Nelon and Debra Talley

Gaither Homecoming Video solos

 2021: Glorious Church; "What Good Are Love Songs"
 2013: The Women of Homecoming, Volume Two; "Lord I'm Listening"
 2012: Gaither Homecoming Celebration; "Born Again"
 2011: The Old Rugged Cross; "Until Then"
 2011: Alaskan Homecoming; "I See a Crimson Stream" with Sheri Easter and Charlotte Ritchie
 2011: Majesty; "I Shall Wear a Crown"
 2011: Tent Revival; "Down to the River To Pray" with Charlotte Ritchie
 2009: Nashville Homecoming; "It Won't Rain Always"
 2007: How Great Thou Art; "Fairest Lord Jesus"
 2005: Jerusalem; "El Shaddai"
 2004: We Will Stand; "When I Survey the Wondrous Cross"
 2003: Going Home; "The Unclouded Day" with Kelly Nelon Clark and Karen Peck
 2003: Heaven; "It's Not About Now"
 2003: Australian Homecoming; "My Soul Is Anchored to the Rock", "I Will Never Leave You Alone"
 2002: God Bless America; "It's Lucky We Met", "It Won't Rain Always"
 2002: New Orleans Homecoming; "He'll Deliver Me"
 2001: Freedom Band; "If I'd Had My Way"
 2001: What A Time!; "God Will Make A Way"
 2000: Oh, My Glory!; "How Are Things at Home?"
 2000: Christmas in the Country; "Sitting by the Fire"
 2000: 50 Years: The Happy Goodman Family; "Friends"
 1999: Mountain Homecoming; "Take This Trial Trip Beside Me"
 1999: So Glad; "Born Again"
 1999: Kennedy Center Homecoming; "The Body and the Blood"
 1998: Hawaiian Homecoming; "Born Again", "God Will Make A Way"
 1998: Atlanta Homecoming; "Something Got A-Hold Of Me"
 1998: Marching To Zion; "Another Soldier's Coming Home"
 1998: Down by the Tabernacle; "Tell Me"
 1996: This is My Story; "You're Still Lord"
 1996: Homecoming Texas Style; "Written in Red"
 1996: Moments to Remember; "God Rides On Wings Of Love"
 1996: Ryman Gospel Reunion; "He'll Deliver Me"
 1996: Joy to the World; "What Did You Say Was the Baby's Name?"
 1996: Sunday Meetin' Time; "I've Never Seen The Righteous Forsaken"
 1994: Holy Ground; "Written in Red"
 1994: All Day Singin' and Dinner on the Ground; "Lead Me to the Rock", "I Am Not Ashamed"

References

External links 
 Janet Paschal – Official site
 Janet Paschal blog - Walking the Good Road

People from Reidsville, North Carolina
1956 births
Living people
Crossroads Music
Southern gospel performers
American women singers
American performers of Christian music
Singers from North Carolina
21st-century American women